Elections in Michigan are held to fill various local, state and federal seats. Special elections may be held to fill vacancies at other points in time. 

In a 2020 study, Michigan was ranked as the 13th easiest state for citizens to vote in.

General elections

1980s-2000s
 1984 presidential election
 1988 presidential election
 1992 presidential election
 1996 presidential election
 2000 presidential election
 2004 presidential election
 2006 gubernatorial election
 2006 U.S. Senate election
 2008 State House elections
 2008 U.S. House elections
 2008 U.S. Senate election
 2008 presidential election

2010s
 2010 U.S. House elections
 2010 gubernatorial election
 2012 U.S. House elections
 2012 U.S. Senate election
 2012 presidential election
 2014 gubernatorial election
 2014 U.S. House elections
 2014 U.S. Senate election
 2016 U.S. House elections
 2016 presidential election
 2018 gubernatorial election

2020s
 2020 Michigan elections
 2022 Michigan elections

Presidential primaries 
 2008 Democratic
 2008 Republican

Ballot measures 
 List of Michigan ballot measures
 1996 Proposal E
 2004 Proposal 2
 2006 Proposal 2
 2012 ballot proposals

Michigan approved plans to expand Medicaid coverage in 2014 to adults with incomes up to 133% of the federal poverty level (approximately $15,500 for a single adult in 2014).

In 2018, the state electorate passed proposals to create an independent redistricting commission, and to legalize the recreational use of marijuana.

In 2020, voters approved two ballot measures, one to increase the limit of money from sales of gas and oil from state-owned land that can benefit state parks, and another to require a warrant for search or seizure of electronic data and communications.

See also
 Political party strength in Michigan
 United States presidential elections in Michigan

Images

References

External links
 Elections in Michigan from the Secretary of State official website
 
 
 
  (State affiliate of the U.S. League of Women Voters)
 . (Also: 1995 & 1996, 1997 & 1998, 1999 & 2000, 2001 & 2002, 2003 & 2004,  2005 & 2006, 2007 & 2008, 2009 & 2010, 2011 & 2012, 2013 & 2014, 2015 & 2016, 2017 & 2018).
 Digital Public Library of America. Assorted materials related to Michigan elections
 

 
Government of Michigan
Political events in Michigan